Kirk is an unincorporated community in Mingo County, West Virginia, United States.

An early variant name was Buttercup.

References

Unincorporated communities in Mingo County, West Virginia
Unincorporated communities in West Virginia